Argiro Barbarigou (born October 22, 1967) is a Greek celebrity chef, restaurateur and cookbook author. She is also the Ambassador for the South Aegean, European Region of Gastronomy, Global Ambassador of Authentic Greek Cuisine. Argiro focuses on Greek cuisine.

Early life 

Barbarigou was born and raised on the island of Paros to Kostanza and Ioannis Barbarigou. She has one sister Nikoletta Barbarigou. In the 1970s, Barbarigou's father owned and ran a restaurant in Paros called Papadakis. Growing up she spent most of her free time assisting and helping their family restaurant.

Education 

Having already worked in their family restaurant in Paros for over 10 years, she studied as a Chef at the Le Cordon Bleu School of Cooking in London. She studied as a Pastry Chef at the Valhrona Ecole du Grand Chocolat in Paris and at Stelios Parliaro's Pastry Chef School in Greece.

Restaurateur, chef, entrepreneur 

Barbarigou revived her farther's Papadakis restaurant in March 1996 by re-opening the restaurant's doors in Naoussa, Paros. Papadakis presented an Aegean Cuisine menu with an emphasis on fish, seafood and authentic local products from all over Greece. 

In 2005, Barbarigou opened her second Papadakis restaurant set at the foothills of Mt. Lycabettus in Athens. A Paros-inspired eatery the restaurant offers a menu focused on seafood and traditional Greek recipes with a modern presentation.

In 2014, Barbarigou launched Homey, a new restaurant concept in the Northern suburbs.

In 2015, Barbarigou launched a series of new food retail products under her personal brand in all major supermarkets in Greece. The same year, she designed the menu for Alfa Piehouse and launched an exclusive line of cookware in collaboration with the Greek advertising agency, J.W. Spot Thomson and the Greek supermarket chain, Delhaize Group AB.

She is currently working on several projects including the opening of her latest restaurant in the West End district of Washington D.C.

Culinary ambassador 

Barbarigou represents Greece and the European Union in events in her titles as Global Ambassador of Greek Cuisine and also as Ambassador of South Aegean Mediterranean Cuisine. She has taken part in a  multitude of events that have ranged from cooking for the US Congress, cooking for Congress and President Bill Clinton, Head Chef and planner for Disney's"OPA! A Celebration of Greece", Keynote Speaker at the Worldchefs 37th Annual Congress, digitally in the WOW Greece campaign, representing Greece in the 32nd Annual Chefs Tribute to City Meals on Wheels, cooking for the members of the James Beard Foundation, Judge and President for the ICAAP "European Young Chef Award".

In 2018 she was named Ambassador of Aegean Cuisine by the European Commission which designated Greece's South Aegean a "Region of Gastronomy".

Humanitarian 

Argiro takes part in a multitude of notable Greek and foreign causes, including the One Greece campaign, which raised awareness and funds for Greece's economic recovery at The Hellenic Initiative inaugural gala in New York City, where she presided as guest celebrity chef for honorary chair President Bill Clinton and donors. Other contributions include spokesperson for the Global Aids Campaign, motivational speaker for female inmates in Greece's correctional system, the crisis awareness WOW Greece campaign, the Annual Chefs Tribute to City Meals on Wheels and mentoring chef for Greece's orphans and foster children in her role as Ambassador of SOS Children's Villages Greece

Best-selling cookbook author 

Argiro has received multiple awards, including three from the French Gourmand Awards. Her monthly magazine is the no. 1 selling magazine in Greece in the category of Greek culinary. The magazine features topics of culinary interest for all ages and genders including a Monthly Menu, Unique Greek Ingredients, Cooking with Children, Delicious Sweets, Healthy recipes and Gluten free.c

TV career 

Argiro's first public TV appearance was on the channel ERT1 for the documentary "ΝΥΝ ΚΑΙ ΑΕΙ", which highlighted Aegean Island life as it was in the 90s. She followed this appearance with more regular appearances on Mega Channel on the show "Καλώς Τους – Kalos Tous". This led to a rise in recognition, which earned her her first daily appearances on the morning show "Ομορφος Κοσμος το Πρωί – Omorfos Kosmos To Proi" on Mega Channel.

She is currently working on a new production called Aegean Mamas Know Best set to premier this fall.

TV appearances/host 
2018–2020ALPHA "Ελένη"
2011 – 2017 ΑΝΤ1 "Το Πρωινό"
2014 – 2016 ΑΝΤ1 "Της ALFA Τα Ζυμώματα"
2014 – 2015 ΑΝΤ1 Satellite "Η ΕΛΛΑΔΑ ΣΤΟ ΠΙΑΤΟ"
2012 – 2013 ΑΝΤ1 "Oreo Cookieng"
2009 – 2011 ΑΝΤ1 "10 ΜΕ 1 ΜΑΖΙ"
2006 – 2009 ALPHA "Καφές με την Ελένη"
2003 – 2004 MEGA "Όμορφος Κόσμος το Πρωί"
2002 – 2003 ALPHA "Καλώς τους"
2018 – todayYouTube "Keep Cooking"

Educator 

Argiro teaches Greek cuisine courses and offers seminars as phyllo dough expert at the Greek cooking school, Le Monde.

Awards and recognitions 

Argiro has received numerous awards, a list of notable awards:

 2019: Ambassador of South Aegean Cuisine, Athens, Greece
 2019: Greek TopWomen Award – Eirinika.gr, Athens, Greece
 2018: Restaurant 100 Award for Papadakis restaurant, Athens, Greece
 2018: Honorary Distinction of Social Contribution of Papadakis Restaurant,UNESCO Πειραιώς και Νήσων, Athens, Greece
 2017: President and chair of the European Young Chef Award, Barcelona, Spain
 2017:  Awarded for her Contribution to Greek Gastronomy as a Woman of the Year, UNESCO Πειραιώς και Νήσων, Athens, Greece
 2014: Ambassador and public spokesperson of the European Campaign «Αφήνω το γόνο...να γίνει γονιός», European Commission
 2014: Best TV Chef Cookbook "ΕΛΛΑΔΑ ΜΟΥ»  Gourmand Awards, Paris France
 2013: Ambassador of Greek & Parian Cuisine, Municipality of Paros Greece
 2013: Global Culinary Ambassador, Chef Club of Northern Greece, United States Congress, Washington D.C, USA
 2011: Awarded Service to the Industry for promoting Greek Cuisine, Epicurian Chef Club of Boston, MA USA
 2010: Cookbook Award in the category "Women Chef", Gourmand Awards, Paris France
 2009: Best Greek Cuisine, Papadakis Restaurant, Toques D'OR, Athens Greece
 2009: Awarded for promoting Greek Cuisine and Gastronomy Abroad, Le Monde, Athens, Greece
 2008: Woman of the Year (Category Best Woman Chef), LIFE & STYLE Magazine, Athens, Greece
 2006–2007: Best Greek Cuisine, Papadakis Restaurant, Gourmet, Athens, Greece
 2002: Best local Cookbook, "ΣΥΝΤΑΓΕΣ ΤΟΥ ΑΙΓΑΙΟΥ", Gourmand Awards, Paris France

References

External links 

 

1967 births
Living people
Alumni of Le Cordon Bleu
Greek food writers
Greek emigrants to the United States
Women chefs
Greek women television personalities
Women cookbook writers
Greek television chefs
People from Paros